is a former Japanese football player.

Playing career
Abe was born in Muroran on June 24, 1983. After graduating from high school, he joined his local club Consadole Sapporo in J1 League in 2002. Consadole was relegated to J2 League end of 2002 season. In opening matches in 2004 season on March 13, he debuted as substitute goalkeeper instead Yosuke Fujigaya received a red card. Although he played several matches, he could not play many matches until 2006. He resigned for health reasons in August 2006.

Club statistics

References

External links

jsgoal.jp

1983 births
Living people
Association football people from Hokkaido
People from Muroran, Hokkaido
Japanese footballers
J1 League players
J2 League players
Hokkaido Consadole Sapporo players
Association football goalkeepers